In geology, frostwork is a type of speleothem (cave formation) with acicular ("needle-like") growths almost always composed of aragonite (a polymorph of calcite) or calcite replaced aragonite. It is a variety of anthodite. Frostwork can also be made of opal or gypsum. In some caves frostwork may grow on top of cave popcorn or boxwork.

In architecture frost-work or frostwork refers to a style of rustication carved with a vertically-oriented pattern evoking hanging pond-weed or algae, or icicles. It is mainly found in garden architecture, where water is to flow over or near the surface.  Other decorative arts may use the term for other decorative patterns imitating frost or ice.

Formation
The origin of frostwork is somewhat controversial. Formation of cave frostwork has been attributed to moist, circulating air which, containing dissolved calcium carbonate, drifted against rock surfaces and coated them with the delicate crystals.  Frostwork has also been attributed to water seepage from cave passageways in which there are relatively high evaporation rates.

Occurrence
Notable frostwork deposits are found in a number of caves in the Black Hills region of South Dakota, US, most notable in Wind Cave National Park and Jewel Cave National Monument and Timpanogos Cave in Utah. Perhaps the most extensive displays known are found in Lechuguilla Cave, New Mexico, US.

Gallery

References

External links
Wind Cave National Park: Speleothems
The Virtual Cave's page on aragonite and frostwork

Speleothems